Leptonema is a genus of flowering plant belonging to the  family Phyllanthaceae first described in 1824. The entire genus is endemic to Madagascar. It is dioecious, with male and female flowers on separate plants.

Species
 Leptonema glabrum (Leandri) Leandri
 Leptonema venosum (Poir.) A.Juss.

formerly included 
moved to Flueggea 
Leptonema melanthesoides F.Muell. - Flueggea virosa subsp. melanthesoides (F.Muell.) G.L.Webster

References

Endemic flora of Madagascar
Phyllanthaceae genera
Phyllanthaceae
Dioecious plants